Antrocaryon micraster is a species of flowering plant in the cashew family, Anacardiaceae. It is native to tropical Africa, where it occurs in Cameroon, the Democratic Republic of the Congo, Ivory Coast, Ghana, Nigeria, Sierra Leone, and Uganda. It grows in gaps in the forest canopy. It is harvested for its wood.

References

Vulnerable plants
Trees of Africa
micraster
Taxonomy articles created by Polbot
Taxa named by Auguste Chevalier
Taxa named by André Guillaumin